PPE suit may refer to:

 PPE gowns, a type of protective equipment largely used in clinical settings
 NBC suits, also known as CBRN suits, a type of specialist equipment used for protection from chemical, biological, radiological or nuclear contamination